Goes debilis is a species of beetle in the family Cerambycidae. It was described by John Lawrence LeConte in 1852. It is known from North America.

References

Lamiini
Beetles described in 1852